The Serie B 1989–90 was the fifty-eighth tournament of this competition played in Italy since its creation.

Teams
Triestina, Reggiana, Cagliari and Foggia had been promoted from Serie C, while Torino, Pescara, Pisa and Como had been relegated from Serie A.

Final classification

Results

Relegation tie-breaker

Monza relegated to Serie C1.

Footnotes

References and sources
Almanacco Illustrato del Calcio - La Storia 1898-2004, Panini Edizioni, Modena, September 2005

Serie B seasons
2
Italy